Senator Brinkley may refer to:

David R. Brinkley (born 1959), Maryland State Senate
Rick Brinkley (born 1961), Oklahoma State Senate